The women's 400 metre freestyle event at the 2018 Commonwealth Games took place on 10 April at the Gold Coast Aquatic Centre.

Records
Prior to this competition, the existing world, Commonwealth and Games records were as follows:

The following records were established during the competition:

Results

Heats
The heats were held at 10:31.

Final
The final was held at 19:37.

References

Women's 400 metre freestyle
Commonwealth Games
Common